Kion de Mexico, founded in 1994, was an aircraft ground services company and airlines related outsourcing company at Mexico City International Airport. The company is a subsidiary of United Continental Holdings.  Kion mainly served United Airlines, another division of UCH, but also serves other airlines including Air Canada, Lufthansa, and US Airways (Star Alliance members). 

Services that Kion de Mexico offered included ramp service, customer service, and cargo management. 

In January 2009, the company ceased operations and sold its service contracts and equipment to Menzies Aviation.

External links 

 KION de Mexico data at siem.gob.mx (mexico´s government. business info system) 

United Airlines
Aircraft ground handling companies
Transport companies established in 1994
Companies based in Mexico City